Events from the year 1647 in Sweden.

Incumbents
 Monarch – Christina

Events

 March 14 – Thirty Years' War: Bavaria, Cologne, France and Sweden sign the Truce of Ulm.
 March 25 – In an incident that attracted attention, an orphan, leads sixteen orphans from the Allmänna Barnhuset up to the royal palace, where she successfully demands to be given an audience with queen Christina and states in a complaint, that the children in the orphanage had been forced to beg on the streets to be given anything to eat.

Births

 18 April - Elias Brenner, painter, numismatist, and archeologist  (died 1717) 
 July 29 - Carl Piper, politician  (died 1716)

Deaths

References

 
Years of the 17th century in Sweden
Sweden